Vietnam women's national under-18 volleyball team represents Vietnam in women's under-18 volleyball events. It is controlled and managed by the Volleyball Federation of Vietnam (VFF) that is a member of Asian volleyball body Asian Volleyball Confederation (AVC) and the international volleyball body government the Fédération Internationale de Volleyball (FIVB).

Competition history

Youth Olympic Games
  2010 – Did not enter

World Championship
 1989 – Did not enter
 1991 – Did not enter
 1993 – Did not enter
 1995 – Did not enter
 1997 – Did not enter
 1999 – Did not enter
 2001 – Did not enter
 2003 – Did not enter
 2005 – Did not qualify
 2007 – Did not enter
 2009 – Did not enter
 2011 – Did not qualify
 2013 – Did not qualify
 2015 – Did not qualify
 2017 – Did not enter
 2019 – Did not enter

Asian Championship
 1997 – Did not enter
 1999 – Did not enter
 2001 – Did not enter
 2003 – Did not enter
 2005 – 7th
 2007 – Did not enter
 2008 – Did not enter
 2010 – 10th
 2012 – 9th
 2014 – 12th
 2017 – Did not enter
 2018 – Did not enter

VTV Cup
 2017 — 6th place

Coaching staff

Current squad

External links
Official website

volleyball
Women's volleyball in Vietnam
National women's under-18 volleyball teams